Valery Abisalovich Gergiev (born 2 May 1953) is a Russian conductor and opera company director. In 1988 he became general director and artistic director of the Mariinsky Theatre and artistic director of the White Nights Festival in St. Petersburg. He was chief conductor of the Munich Philharmonic from September 2015 until he was dismissed on 1 March 2022.

Early life
Gergiev was born in Moscow. He is the son of Tamara Timofeevna (Tatarkanovna) Lagkueva and Abisal Zaurbekovich Gergiev, both of Ossetian origin. He and his siblings were raised in Vladikavkaz in North Ossetia in the Caucasus. He had his first piano lessons in secondary school before going on to study at the Leningrad Conservatory from 1972 to 1977.

His principal conducting teacher was Ilya Musin. His sister, Larissa, is a pianist and director of the Mariinsky's singers' academy.

Career
In 1978, Gergiev became assistant conductor at the Kirov Opera, now the Mariinsky Opera, under Yuri Temirkanov, where he made his debut conducting Sergei Prokofiev's War and Peace. He was chief conductor of the Armenian Philharmonic Orchestra from 1981 until 1985 – the year he made his debut in the United Kingdom, along with pianist Evgeny Kissin and violinists Maxim Vengerov and Vadim Repin at the Lichfield Festival.

In 1988, Gergiev guest-conducted the London Symphony Orchestra for the first time. In his next appearance with the LSO in 2004, he conducted the seven symphonies of Sergei Prokofiev. This engagement led to his appointment in 2005 as the Orchestra's fifteenth principal conductor, succeeding Sir Colin Davis with effect from 1 January 2007. Gergiev's initial contract with the LSO was for 3 years.

In 1991, Gergiev conducted a western European opera company for the first time, leading the Bavarian State Opera in a performance of Modest Mussorgsky's Boris Godunov in Munich. In the same year, he made his American début, performing War and Peace with the San Francisco Opera. Since then, he has conducted both operatic and orchestral repertoire across the world. He also participates in numerous music festivals, including the White Nights in St. Petersburg.

He became chief conductor and artistic director of the Mariinsky in 1988, and overall director of the company, appointed by the Russian government, in 1996. In addition to his artistic work with the Mariinsky, Gergiev has worked in fundraising for such projects as the recently built 1100-seat Mariinsky Hall, and intends to renovate the Mariinsky Theatre completely by 2010.

In 1998, Gergiev conducted the American Russian Young Artists Orchestra at the Moscow Youth Olympics.

After the 2004 Beslan school massacre, Gergiev appealed on television for calm and against revenge. He conducted concerts to commemorate the victims of the massacre.

His first official concert as principal conductor of the LSO was on 23 January 2007; it was originally scheduled for 13 January, but was postponed due to Gergiev's illness.

In April 2007 Gergiev was one of eight conductors of British orchestras to endorse the ten-year classical music outreach manifesto, "Building on Excellence: Orchestras for the 21st century", to increase the presence of classical music in the UK, including giving free entry to all British schoolchildren to a classical music concert.

During the 2008 South Ossetia war, Gergiev, who is of partial Ossetian heritage himself, accused the Georgian government of massacring ethnic Ossetians, triggering the conflict with Russia. He came to Tskhinvali and conducted a concert near the ruined building of the South Ossetian Parliament as tribute to the victims of the war.

In June 2011, Gergiev joined the International Tchaikovsky Competition and introduced reforms to the organisation.

In 2015 Gergiev became chief conductor of the Munich Philharmonic, but his contract was terminated in March 2022 after he refused to condemn the 2022 Russian invasion of Ukraine.

In March 2016, Gergiev conducted the Vienna Philharmonic Orchestra on a South American tour. The programme included Tchaikovsky’s Manfred Symphony in B minor, and Wagner’s prelude from “Parsifal” – usually executed together with the “Good Friday Music” from the same opera.
Performances took place in two consecutive nights at the prestigious Sala São Paulo hall - home of the São Paulo State Symphony Orchestra. The last concert included a single appearance with the Vienna Philharmonic in Bogotá, Colombia.

On 5 May 2016, Gergiev performed at the Roman Theatre of Palmyra at a concert event called Praying for Palmyra – Music revives ancient ruins. It was devoted to the victims who died while liberating Palmyra from ISIS.

Political involvement
Gergiev has been, according to Alex Ross in The New Yorker, "a prominent supporter of the current Russian regime" of Vladimir Putin. In 2012, in a television ad for Putin's third Presidential campaign, he said: "One needs to be able to hold oneself presidentially, so that people reckon with the country. I don't know if it's fear? Respect? Reckoning."

In December 2012, Gergiev sided with the Putin administration against the members of Russian band Pussy Riot and suggested that their motivation was commercial.

In New York City in 2013, the LGBT activist group Queer Nation interrupted performances by orchestras conducted by Gergiev at the Metropolitan Opera and Carnegie Hall. The activists cited Gergiev's support for Vladimir Putin, whose government had recently enacted a law that bans the distribution of "propaganda of non-traditional sexual relations" to minors, as the reason for their actions. In London, the veteran activist Peter Tatchell led anti-Gergiev demonstrations. In a public statement Gergiev replied: "It is wrong to suggest that I have ever supported anti-gay legislation and in all my work I have upheld equal rights for all people. I am an artist and have for over three decades worked with tens of thousands of people and many of them are indeed my friends." Writing in The Guardian, Mark Brown wrote: "Gergiev's case was not helped by comments he made to the Dutch newspaper De Volkskrant on 10 September [2013]: 'In Russia we do everything we can to protect children from paedophiles. This law is not about homosexuality, it targets paedophilia. But I have too busy a schedule to explore this matter in detail. On 26 December 2013, the city of Munich made public a letter from Gergiev assuring them that he fully supports the city's anti-discrimination law and adding: "In my entire professional career as an artist, I have always and everywhere adhered to these principles and will do so in the future... All other allegations hurt me very much."

In March 2014 he joined a host of other Russian arts and cultural figures in signing an open letter in support of the Annexation of Crimea by the Russian Federation. The letter was posted on the website of Russia's culture ministry on 12 March 2014. In the letter signatories stated that they "firmly declare our support for the position of the president of the Russian Federation" in the region. However, in September 2015, as he became chief conductor of the Munich Philharmonic, Gergiev said that he did not really sign the letter to Putin, but only had a phone conversation about it with Vladimir Medinsky. The New York Times reported that Russian artists may have been pushed by the Russian government to endorse the annexation of Crimea. The article specifically mentioned Gergiev, who faced protests in New York City while performing. After a public outcry in the country, the Ukrainian Ministry of Culture blacklisted Gergiev from performing in Ukraine.

Terminations after 2022 Russian invasion of Ukraine
Following the 2022 Russian invasion of Ukraine, the Rotterdam Philharmonic Orchestra said that it would drop Gergiev from its September festival if he did not stop supporting Putin. Milan's La Scala also sent a letter to Gergiev asking him to declare his support for a peaceful resolution in Ukraine or he would not be permitted to complete his engagement conducting Tchaikovsky's The Queen of Spades. This followed an announcement by New York City's Carnegie Hall that it had canceled two May performances by the Mariinsky Theatre Orchestra that were to be conducted by Gergiev, and the Vienna Philharmonic dropping Gergiev from a five-concert tour in the U.S. that was to start on 25 February.

On 28 February, the Verbier Festival requested and accepted Gergiev's resignation as Music Director of the Verbier Festival Orchestra. On 1 March, Munich's mayor Dieter Reiter announced the termination of Gergiev's contract as conductor of the Munich Philharmonic for failing to respond to a demand that he condemn the "brutal war of aggression that Putin is waging against Ukraine and now, in particular, against our sister city of Kyiv". On 13 October, has been expelled from his position as a foreign member of the Royal Swedish Academy of Music for his reluctance to condemn Russian invasion of Ukraine.

Personal life
In 1999, Gergiev married musician Natalya Dzebisova—a teenager at the time, 27 years his junior, and also of Ossetian descent. They have three children together: two boys and a girl. From time to time, Gergiev has been reported to be a friend of Putin; they have been said to be godfathers to each other's children, but in a letter to The Daily Telegraph Gergiev rejected this notion. From a past relationship with the language teacher Lena Ostovich, he has another daughter, Natasha.

In April 2022, the Anti-Corruption Foundation of Russian Kremlin critic Alexei Navalny released a video revealing the immense wealth of Gergiev, including various properties in Italy (among others Palazzo Barbarigo in Venice), the U.S. and Russia. A significant part of his wealth is said to stem from the inheritance of Yoko Nagae Ceschina.

Recordings
Gergiev has focused on recording Russian composers' works, both operatic and symphonic, including Mikhail Glinka, Pyotr Ilyich Tchaikovsky, Alexander Borodin, Nikolai Rimsky-Korsakov, Sergei Prokofiev, Dmitri Shostakovich, Igor Stravinsky and Rodion Shchedrin. Most of his recordings, on the Philips label, are with the Kirov Orchestra, but he has also recorded with the Vienna Philharmonic. Recent undertaking such as the complete Prokofiev symphonies (from the live concerts of 2004) and a Berlioz cycle, are with the London Symphony Orchestra.

Gergiev's recording of Prokofiev's Romeo and Juliet with London Symphony Orchestra on LSO Live in 2010 was voted the winner of the Orchestral category and the Disc of the Year for the 2011 BBC Music Magazine Awards.

Discography

Ballets

Operas

Orchestral works

Orchestral works with soloists

Vocal works

Videos

DVD  

 Valery Gergiev in Rehearsal and Performance
 Verdi: La forza del destino, Marinsky Theatre Orchestra, 1998.
Valery Gergiev Conducts the Vienna Philharmonic Orchestra in Prokofiev, Schnittke & Stravinsky, 2003.
60 Minutes: The Wild Man of Music, 2004.
 Prokofiev: Betrothal in a Monastery, Kirov Opera, 2005.
 Shostakovich against Stalin, 2005.
Rimsky-Korsakov: Sadko, Kirov Opera, 2006.
 Puccini: Turandot, Vienna Philharmonic, 2006.
 "All the Russias – a musical journey": a five-part documentary through the tradition and heritage of Russian music.
Tschaikovsky: Eugene Onegin; Dmitri Hvorostovsky, Renee Fleming, Ramon Vargas, Metropolitan Opera, 2007
"Gergiev Conducts Brahms: Ein Deutsches Requiem" Kringelborn, Kwiecien, Swedish Radio Choir, Rotterdam Philharmonic, 2008
Berlioz:
Benvenuto Cellini, Burkhard Fritz (Benvenuto Cellini), Maija Kovalevska (Teresa), Laurent Naouri (Fieramosca), Kate Aldrich (Ascanio), Xavier Mas (Francesco), Brindley Sherratt (Balducci), Roberto Tagliavini (Bernardino), Adam Plachetka (Pompeo), Sung-Keun Park (Innkeeper), Mikhail Petrenko (Pope Clement VII), Wiener Philharmoniker, Konzertvereinigung Wiener Staatsopernchor, Philipp Stozl, Stage Director. Blu-ray or DVD Naxos 2007 - 2009 
Les Troyens, Lance Ryan, Énée, Gabriele Viviani, Corhèbe, Gorgio Guiseppini, Panthée, Stephen Milling, Narbal, Éric Cutler, Iopas, Dmitri Voropaev, Hylas, Oksana Shilova, Ascagne,  Elisabete Matos, Cassandre, Daniele Barcellona, Didon, Ziata Bulicheva Anna, Cor de la Generolitat Valenciana, Orquestra de la Comunitat Valenciana, Carlus Padrissa, Stage Director. (Recorded on 2009) Blu-ray or DVD Unitel Classica 2010

VHS  
 Tchaikovsky: Pique Dame, Acts 1 and 2, Kirov Opera, 1992.
Mussorgsky: Boris Godunov, Kirov Opera, 1993.
 Tchaikovsky: Pique Dame, Kirov Opera, 1994.
 Mussorgsky: Kovanshchina, Kirov Orchestra, 1994.
 Prokofiev: Fiery Angel, Polygram Video, 1996.

Honours and awards 
Russian
 Order of Merit for the Fatherland;
 3rd class (24 April 2003) – for outstanding contribution to music culture
 4th class (2 May 2008) – for outstanding contribution to the development of domestic and world music and theatre, many years of creative activity
 Order of Friendship (12 April 2000) – for services to the state, many years of fruitful work in the field of culture and art, a great contribution to strengthening friendship and cooperation between nations
 Medal "In Commemoration of the 300th Anniversary of Saint Petersburg" (2003)
 Gratitude of the President of the Russian Federation (15 January 2009) – for the concert the Mariinsky Theatre orchestra under the direction of Valery Gergiev in support of victims during the Georgian-Ossetian conflict
 Medal "For Valiant Labour" (Tatarstan) – for a fruitful cooperation with the Republic of Tatarstan, an active part in national projects in the fields of culture, outstanding contribution to the development of domestic and world music
 Hero of Labour of the Russian Federation – for particular services to the State and its people. The new honour was created 29 March 2013, and first awarded on 1 May 2013.

Foreign awards
 Order of St. Mashtots (Armenia, 2000)
 Grand Officer of the Order of Merit of the Italian Republic (2001)
 Order "Danaker" (2001, Kyrgyzstan)
 Medal "Dank" (Kyrgyzstan, 1998)
 Knight of the Order of the Netherlands Lion (2005)
 Order of Prince Yaroslav the Wise, 5th class (Ukraine, 10 May 2006) – a significant personal contribution to the development of cultural ties between Ukraine and Russia, high professionalism and many years of fruitful creative activity
 Officer's Cross of the Order of Merit of the Federal Republic of Germany (2001)
 Commander of the Order of the Lion of Finland (2006)
 Officer of the Legion of Honour (France, 2007)
 Order of Arts and Letters (France)
 Order of the Rising Sun with Golden Rays and Ribbon (Japan, 2006)
 Uatsamonga Order (South Ossetia, 29 January 2009) – for courage and great patriotism, invaluable assistance and support to the people of South Ossetia during the Georgian aggression disaster in August 2008
 Honoured Worker of Kazakhstan (2011)
 Silver medal in Valencia (Spain, 2006)
 Medal Pro Mikkeli (Mikkeli, Finland, 2005)
 Medal Johan van Oldenbarnevelt (2008, Rotterdam, The Netherlands)
 Gold Medal for Merit to Culture (Gloria Artis) (Poland, 2011)

Religious awards
 Order of Holy Prince Daniel of Moscow, 3rd class (Russian Orthodox Church, 2003)
 Order of St. Vladimir (Ukrainian Orthodox Church, 2001)
 Medal of St. Sergius of Radonezh, 1st class (Russian Orthodox Church, 2010).

Community Awards
 Commemorative Gold Medal "olive branch with Diamonds" (the Russian-Armenian (Slavic) State University)

Titles
 People's Artist of Russia (20 June 1996) – for the great achievements in art
 People's Artist of Ukraine (2004)
 People's Artist of North Ossetia – Alania
 Honorary citizen of St. Petersburg (2007), Vladikavkaz (2003), Lyon and Toulouse
 "Conductor of the Year" (1994) awarded by a jury of the international organization International Classical Music Awards
 UNESCO Artist for Peace (2003)
 Honorary Doctor of St. Petersburg State University
 Honorary Professor of Moscow State University (2001)

Awards
 State Prize of the Russian Federation in the field of art and literature in 1993 (7 December 1993) and 1998 (4 June 1999)
 Prize awarded by the President of the Russian Federation in the field of literature and art in 2001 (30 January 2002)
 Winner of the country's theatrical prize "Golden Mask" (five times from 1996 to 2000)
 Winner of the Theatre Award of Saint Petersburg "Gold soffit" (four times; 1997, 1998, 2000 and 2003)
 Russian opera prize «Casta diva» for the best performance – "Parsifal" (1998)
 Winner of Tsarskoye Selo Art Prize (1999)
 Shostakovich Prize (Yuri Bashmet Foundation, 1997)
 Royal Swedish Academy of Music Polar Music Prize (2005)
 Herbert von Karajan Prize winner (Baden-Baden, 2006)
 Laureate of the Foundation of American-Russian Cultural Cooperation (2006)
 Polar Music Prize (together with Led Zeppelin) (2006)
 DaCapo KlassiK Award - Conductor of the Year (2014)

See also
 Ballerina (documentary)

References

External links

 
 

21st-century Russian conductors (music)
Russian male conductors (music)
21st-century Russian male musicians
Soviet conductors (music)
Artistic directors (music)
Music directors (opera)
London Symphony Orchestra principal conductors
Recipients of the Order "For Merit to the Fatherland", 3rd class
Officers Crosses of the Order of Merit of the Federal Republic of Germany
Grand Officers of the Order of Merit of the Italian Republic
Knights of the Order of the Netherlands Lion
Commanders of the Order of the Lion of Finland
Officiers of the Légion d'honneur
Recipients of the Ordre des Arts et des Lettres
Recipients of the Order of the Rising Sun, 3rd class
Recipients of the Gold Medal for Merit to Culture – Gloria Artis
Recipients of the Order of St. Vladimir
People's Artists of Russia
Recipients of the title of People's Artists of Ukraine
State Prize of the Russian Federation laureates
Recipients of the Order of Holy Prince Daniel of Moscow
Honorary Members of the Royal Academy of Music
Saint Petersburg Conservatory alumni
Ossetian people
1953 births
Living people
Conductors of the Metropolitan Opera
Herbert von Karajan Music Prize winners
Recipients of the Order "For Merit to the Fatherland", 4th class